Santa Rosa County District Schools (SRCDS), also known as Santa Rosa County School District, is the organization responsible for the administration of public schools in Santa Rosa County, Florida. The district currently administers 15 elementary schools, seven middle schools, six high schools, and a K-8 school, as well as a number of specialized centers.

Its headquarters are in Milton.

The district is currently administered by a superintendent and a five-member school board. The current Superintendent of Schools is Dr. Karen Barber.

Schools

High schools

Gulf Breeze High School (Dolphin)
Navarre High School (Raider)
Pace High School (Patriot)
Milton High School (Panther)
Jay High School (Royal)
Central School (Jaguar)

Middle schools
Gulf Breeze Middle School
Woodlawn Beach Middle School
East Bay K-8 School
Holley-Navarre Middle School
Avalon Middle School
King Middle School
Hobbs Middle School
Sims Middle School
Central School

Elementary schools
Gulf Breeze Elementary School
Oriole Beach Elementary School
East Bay K-8 School
West Navarre Intermediate School
West Navarre Primary School
Holley-Navarre Primary School
Holley-Navarre Intermediate School
Pea Ridge Elementary School
Bagdad Elementary School
Berryhill Elementary School
S.S. Dixon Primary School
S.S. Dixon Intermediate School
East Milton Elementary School
Chumuckla Elementary School
W.H. Rhodes Elementary School
Jay Elementary School
Central School
Bennett C. Russell Elementary School

Specialized Centers
Locklin Technical College
Santa Rosa Adult School
Santa Rosa Community School
T.R. Jackson Pre-K Center

References

External links

Pensacola metropolitan area
Education in Santa Rosa County, Florida
School districts in Florida